The OFC Nations Cup in an association football competition established in 1973. It is contested by the men's national teams of the members of the Oceania Football Confederation (OFC), the sport's Oceania governing body, and takes place every four years. The winners of the first final was New Zealand, who defeated Tahiti 2–0 in Auckland. The most recent final, hosted in Port Moresby, was also won by New Zealand, who beat Papua New Guinea 4–2 on penalties.

The Nations Cup final is the last match of competition, and the result determines which country's team is declared Oceania champion. As of the 2016 tournament, if after 90 minutes of regular play the score is a draw, an additional 30-minute period of play, called extra time, is added. If such a game is still tied after extra time, it is decided by penalty shoot-out. The team that wins the penalty shoot-out are then declared champions. In 2008, there was no Final played, the winner was only decided in a round-robin tournament.

New Zealand is the most successful team in the history of the tournament, winning five times. However, New Zealand and Australia both has won the Final four times each. New Caledonia has qualified for the final twice without success.

List of finals

 The "Year" column refers to the year the championship tournament was held, and wikilinks to the article about that tournament.
 Links in the "Winners" and "Runners-up" columns point to the articles for the national football teams of the countries, not the articles for the countries.
 The wikilinks in the "Score" column point to the article about that tournament's final game.

Results by nation

See also
 List of FIFA Confederations Cup finals
 List of FIFA World Cup finals

Notes

References

External links
 Official website

OFC Nations Cup Finals
OFC Nations Cup